George Oscar Russel (1890, in Conejos, Colorado – March 17, 1962) was an American speech scientist.  He was a professor at the Ohio State University and published an influential book in 1928 called The Vowel: Its Physiological Mechanism as Shown by X-Ray.  He was a student of Ludimar Hermann.

External links
Biography at "A short history of Speech Pathology in America" site

1890 births
1962 deaths
Ohio State University faculty
Linguists from the United States